Øverland is a Norwegian surname. As of 2013, 1,543 people in Norway have this surname.

Notable people
Notable people with this surname include:
 Arnulf Øverland, Norwegian author
 Erling Øverland, Norwegian businessperson
 Indra Øverland, Norwegian specialist on energy politics
 Jon Terje Øverland, Norwegian alpine skier
 Margrete Aamot Øverland, Norwegian resistance member during the Second World War
 Randi Øverland, Norwegian politician

References